Plunder of the Sun is a 1949 novel written by David F. Dodge about a hunt for ancient Peruvian treasure. It was adapted for the November 8, 1949 episode of the radio series Escape and later into the 1953 film noir of the same title, starring Glenn Ford and with the location changed to Mexico.

Plot
Adventurer Al Colby is persuaded by Anna Luz and her antiquities-collector husband Thomas Berrien to help them smuggle a parcel into Mexico where its true value can be ascertained.

Warned that a man named Jefferson traveling on the same freighter might try to steal the parcel, Colby forms a partnership with Jefferson following Berrien's fatal heart attack aboard the ship. Jefferson betrays and shoots Colby, but Colby saves himself and the rare documents in time. They will be returned to a museum while he and Anna can enjoy a $25,000 reward.

Cast
Glenn Ford as Al Colby
Diana Lynn as Julie Barnes
Patricia Medina as Anna Luz
Francis L. Sullivan as Thomas Berrien
Sean McClory as Jefferson
Eduardo Noriega as Raul Cornejo
Julio Villarreal as Ulbaldo Navarro
Charles Rooner as Captain Bergman
Douglass Dumbrille as Consul

Gallery

References

External links

 

Films directed by John Farrow
1949 American novels
1953 films
1950s adventure films
American black-and-white films
1953 crime drama films
Films produced by John Wayne
Novels set in Peru
American novels adapted into films
Films based on American novels
Films set in Mexico
Films set in Havana
Films shot in Mexico
Batjac Productions films
Treasure hunt films
American crime drama films
1950s English-language films
1950s American films